The Mazda EX-005 (Japanese::マツダEX005ハイブリッド) was a microcar made in Japan in 1970. It was shown at the 1970 Tokyo Motor Show. It was steered by a joystick, and was the size of an office chair. The EX-005 was designed to be an urban commuter car, but due to a lack of comfort, space, and safety, the EX-005 stayed a concept vehicle and never made production.

See also
 Microcar
 Mazda

References

EX-005
Mazda
Microcars
Cars introduced in 1970
Cars of Japan